Yvette Farnoux, (née Baumann; 17 October 1919 Paris - 7 November 2015 Vanves) was a French resistance fighter, and concentration camp survivor. On 15 March 1990, she was awarded the Grand Officer of the Legion of Honor, then the Grand Cross on 31 December 2008.
She studied at the Lycée Molière. She worked at the unemployment office, of the Secours national. In the Resistance, she worked with Berty Albrecht; and succeeded her as national head of social services for the united movements of the Resistance. Arrested, she was deported on 29 April 1944, from the Drancy internment camp to Auschwitz, and then Ravensbrück.

She is the founding president of the Memory of the deportees and Europe association of resistants.

References

French Resistance members
Auschwitz concentration camp survivors

Ravensbrück concentration camp survivors
1919 births
2015 deaths